A plastic cup is a cup made out of plastic, commonly used as a container to hold beverages.  Some are reusable while others are intended for a single use followed by recycling or disposal. 

Disposable plastic cups are often used for gatherings where it would be inconvenient to wash dishes afterward, due to factors such as location or number of guests. Plastic cups can be used for storing most liquids, but hot liquids may melt or warp the material. A common design in the United States is a red plastic cup, often used for serving alcoholic beverages.

Environmental issues

Most plastic cups are designed for single uses and then disposal or recycling. A life cycle inventory of a comparison of paper and plastic shows environmental effects of both with no clear winner.

The choice between paper cups and plastic cups has to do with the life of the item after use. A paper cup may biodegrade faster than a expanded polystyrene (EPS) foam cup or a plastic cup. In general cardboard or paper takes one to three months for biodegradation, as the majority of the content, up to 95%, is made with wood chips. A plastic cup can take up to 90 years to biodegrade, depending on the type of plastic.

Plastic cups are made with oil, which is not a renewable source. On the other hand, paper cups can be sourced from forests which fall under sustainable management.

Plastic cups, especially those made with polystyrene, are also a possible health hazard as chemicals may leach into the beverage. This is more likely to happen with warm drinks (hot chocolate, tea and coffee) than with cold drinks.

See also
 Coffee cup
 Cup holder
 Paper cup
 Polylactic acid (used in making decomposable plastic cups)

References

Disposable products
Liquid containers
Drinkware
Plastics applications